Hullabaloo is a 1940 American musical comedy film directed by Edwin L. Marin and written by Nat Perrin. It stars Frank Morgan, Virginia Grey, Dan Dailey, Billie Burke, Donald Meek, Reginald Owen, and Connie Gilchrist. Jack Albertson, Leo Gorcey, and Arthur O'Connell appear in bit roles.

Plot
Morgan is the star of the film, as fading actor Frankie Merriweather, who is trying to revive his career by starring on a radio program. When his most recent broadcast, a science fiction invasion from Mars story, panics the nation, he is fired. He decides to jumpstart his career by creating a new show which features his talented children.

Cast
 Frank Morgan as Frankie Merriweather
 Virginia Grey as Laura Merriweather
 Dan Dailey as Bob Strong
 Billie Burke as Penny Merriweather
 Nydia Westman as Lulu Perkins
 Ann Morriss as Wilma Norton
 Donald Meek as Clyde Perkins
 Reginald Owen as Buzz Foster
 Charles Holland as Singing Bellhop
 Leni Lynn as Judy Merriweather
 Virginia O'Brien as Virginia Ferris
 Curt Bois as Armand Francois
 Sara Haden as Sue Merriweather
 Larry Nunn as Terry Merriweather
 Barnett Parker as Samuel Stephens
 Connie Gilchrist as Arline Merriweather

Production
A highlight of the film is Morgan's reenactment of the current MGM hit film Boom Town, with Morgan's character, Frank Merriweather, supposedly imitating the voices of the stars of that film. In fact, the Boom Town stars' voices were dubbed over Morgan's. The voices of Clark Gable, Claudette Colbert, Spencer Tracy, and Hedy Lamarr are used.

External links

Still with Ann Morriss and Dan Dailey at gettyimages.com

1940 films
1940 musical comedy films
1940 romantic comedy films
American musical comedy films
American romantic comedy films
American romantic musical films
American black-and-white films
1940s English-language films
Films directed by Edwin L. Marin
Metro-Goldwyn-Mayer films
1940s romantic musical films
1940s American films